Wah Nu is a contemporary artist from Myanmar.

Early life and education 

Wah Nu was born in 1977 in Yangon, Myanmar. In 1998, she graduated from the University of Culture, Yangon  where she majored in music.

Career 

After graduating, she launched herself on an artistic career. Since then, she has developed a personal expression by mainly adopting painting and video as media.

In 2004, she was held her first solo exhibition “Cloud Department” in Yangon and showed in group exhibitions including Bangladesh Biennale. She was also showed her second solo exhibition “Self-Identity” in the Art-U room gallery, Tokyo, Japan and participated at group exhibitions, Fukuoka Triennale in 2005.

At 2008, she participated group exhibition in Another Seven Artists in Yangon. In 2009, she participate with her husband, artist, Tun Win Aung in The 6th Asia Pacific Triennial of Contemporary Art in Brisbane .

Selected exhibitions

Selected solo exhibitions
2020 Wah Nu: Clouds, Richard Koh Fine Art, Singapore, Singapore, Singapore
2008 Wah Nu: The Rising Sun, Art-U room, Shibuya-ku, Tokyo, Japan
2005 Wah Nu: Self-Identity, Art-U room, Shibuya-ku, Tokyo, Japan
2004 Wah Nu: Cloud Department, Lokanat Galleries, Yangon, Myanmar

Selected group exhibitions

2019 Montage of the Time - Expansion of Video Art in Asia, Fukuoka Asian Art Museum, Fukuoka, Japan 
2018 Hakarie Contemporary Art Eye Vol. 10 - Eight Contemporary Artists from Southeast Asia, Cube 1 2 3, Tokyo, Japan
2017 Beyond Narrative, Wizaya Cinema, Yangon, Myanmar
2011 Inner Voices, 21st Century Museum of Contemporary Art, Kanazawa, Japan

Selected collective solo exhibitions
2018 Sound Weaving, National Museum, Yangon, Myanmar
2016 Blurring the Boundaries (2007-2012), Chan + Hori Contemporary, Singapore, Singapore 
2011 Tun Win Aung and Wah Nu, Meulensteen Gallery, Chelsea, New York, USA
2011 Tun Win Aung and Wah Nu: Some Pieces (of White), Art-U room, Shibuya-ku, Tokyo, Japan

Selected collective group exhibitions

2016 An Atlas of Mirrors, Singapore Biennale 2016, Singapore Art Museum, Singapore
2015 Convergence, The National Gallery, Bangkok, Thailand
2013 No Country: Contemporary Art for South and Southeast Asia, Solomon R. Guggenheim Museum, New York, United States
2011 Back to the Museum Per Se, The 4th Guangzhou Triennial, Guangdong Museum of Modern Art, Guangzhou, China

Public collections 

Fukuoka Asian Art Museum, Fukuoka, Japan
Solomon R. Guggenheim Museum, New York, United States
Kadist, San Francisco, United States
Centre Pompidou, Paris, France
Queensland Art Gallery / Gallery of Modern Art, Brisbane, Australia
Singapore Art Museum, Singapore

Personal life
Wah Nu married to artist Tun Win Aung, who works in multimedia installations and performance arts.

References

Living people
1977 births
Burmese painters
Burmese performance artists
Burmese writers